The 2016 UK Open Qualifiers consisted of 6 darts tournaments on the 2016 PDC Pro Tour, used to determine seedings for the 2016 UK Open.

Prize money
The prize money for the UK Open qualifiers had each event having a prize fund of £60,000.

This is how the prize money is divided:

Reuslts

Qualifier 1
Qualifier 1 was contested on Friday 5 February 2016 at the Robin Park Tennis Centre in Wigan.  hit a nine-dart finish against .

Qualifier 2
Qualifier 2 was contested on Saturday 6 February 2016 at the Robin Park Tennis Centre in Wigan.

Qualifier 3
Qualifier 3 was contested on Sunday 7 February 2016 at the Robin Park Tennis Centre in Wigan.

Qualifier 4
Qualifier 4 was contested on Friday 19 February 2016 at the Robin Park Tennis Centre in Wigan.

Qualifier 5
Qualifier 5 was contested on Saturday 20 February 2016 at the Robin Park Tennis Centre in Wigan.

Qualifier 6
Qualifier 6 was contested on Sunday 21 February 2016 at the Robin Park Tennis Centre in Wigan.  hit a nine-dart finish against .

References

2016 in darts
2016 PDC Pro Tour